"Wine mom" is a term that is used to describe a typically upper middle class mother, often with young children, who turns to alcoholic drinks to cope with being over-worked or fatigued from parenting. Alternatively, the term 'Wine Mom' may also be used as a label of self empowerment, or as a means of finding acceptance by others in a social group. While this term is most frequently used to describe parents, its usage extends to other individuals as well. The term may also be used in a self descriptive manner, and it is not necessary for a third party to label one as a "wine mom."

History

The term "wine mom" first came into popular use during the COVID-19 pandemic, though the terms origins date back to at least pre-2016.

Factors that have been considered relevant by commentators include:

 working full-time at home
 loneliness/lack of social interaction in a home or apartment due to COVID-19 restrictions or otherwise
 being a single parent
 raising one or more children concomitant to other parental duties
 lack of personal space or privacy
 social pressures or conformity to drink
 general feelings of being overwhelmed
 the perception that wine is a 'healthy' alternative to other alcoholic beverages, or more socially acceptable

See also
 Alcohol and health
 Karen (slang)
 OK boomer
 Snowflake (slang)

References 

2010s neologisms
2020s neologisms
2010s slang
2020s slang
Motherhood
Wine culture